Cornwall is a town in Addison County, Vermont, United States. It was founded November 3, 1761. The population was 1,207 at the 2020 census.

Geography
Cornwall is located in south-central Addison County, in the Champlain Valley. It is bordered by the town of Middlebury (the county seat) to the northeast, Salisbury to the southeast, Whiting to the south, Shoreham to the southwest, Bridport to the west, and Weybridge to the north. Otter Creek forms the town border with Salisbury. Vermont Route 30, also known as the "Seth Warner Memorial Highway" and named for notable Vermonter Seth Warner, passes north–south through Cornwall, while Vermont Route 125 passes east–west through the northern part of the town. Vermont Route 74 leads southwest from the center of town, towards the Ticonderoga–Larrabees Point Ferry across Lake Champlain.

Landmarks 
Cornwall is home to a monument of fallen soldiers from several wars. Most recent inscription is of a soldier who was killed on the Verdun Front on 10 November 1918, a day before the armistice.

Demographics

As of the census of 2000, there were 1,136 people, 427 households, and 322 families residing in the town.  The population density was 39.7 people per square mile (15.3/km2).  There were 464 housing units at an average density of 16.2 per square mile (6.3/km2).  The racial makeup of the town was 98.24% White, 0.09% African American, 0.62% Asian, 0.26% from other races, and 0.79% from two or more races. Hispanic or Latino of any race were 0.44% of the population.

There were 427 households, out of which 34.0% had children under the age of 18 living with them, 65.6% were married couples living together, 6.6% had a female householder with no husband present, and 24.4% were non-families. 18.3% of all households were made up of individuals, and 7.7% had someone living alone who was 65 years of age or older.  The average household size was 2.66 and the average family size was 3.03.

In the town, the age distribution of the population shows 25.6% under the age of 18, 7.8% from 18 to 24, 23.1% from 25 to 44, 30.7% from 45 to 64, and 12.8% who were 65 years of age or older.  The median age was 41 years. For every 100 females, there were 101.8 males.  For every 100 females age 18 and over, there were 95.2 males.

The median income for a household in the town was $52,692, and the median income for a family was $59,792. Males had a median income of $36,563 versus $23,913 for females. The per capita income for the town was $26,902.  About 3.4% of families and 5.6% of the population were below the poverty line, including 2.4% of those under age 18 and 5.1% of those age 65 or over.

Education 

Cornwall public school is the kindergarten-sixth grade Bingham Memorial School.

Middle school students attend Middlebury Union Middle School (MUMS) and high school students who live in Cornwall attend Middlebury Union High School (MUHS) in Middlebury, Vermont.

Notable people 

 Chauncey Abbott (1815–1872), Wisconsin politician
 Luther Loren Baxter (1832–1915), Minnesota politician, lawyer, and judge
 Marvin Dana (1867–1926), author and magazine editor
 Solomon Foot (1802–1866), lawyer, US congressman and senator
 Abram W. Foote (1862–1941), 51st lieutenant governor of Vermont
 Charles G. Lewis, Wisconsin assemblyman
 Charles Linsley, Vermont attorney and politician
 Joel H. Linsley (1790–1868), Congregational minister and first president of Marietta College
 Luke Reynolds (born 1979), artist, musician, member since 2010 of rock band Guster
 Enoch Cobb Wines (1806–1879), Congregational minister and penologist

References

External links

 Town of Cornwall official website
 Bingham Memorial School, K–6 school in Cornwall
 Cornwall Historical Society

 
Towns in Vermont
Towns in Addison County, Vermont